I34 may refer to:
 Greensburg Municipal Airport, in Decatur County, Indiana
 , a Type B1 submarine of the Imperial Japanese Navy
 Inhibitor I34, a protease inhibitor